Terry Peter Pilkadaris (born 30 October 1973) is an Australian professional golfer.

Pilkadaris was born in Perth, Western Australia. He turned professional in 1998, joining the PGA Tour of Australasia. Since 2002 he has played on the Asian Tour, where he has won three tournaments. He was fifth on the Asian Tour Order of Merit in both 2004 and 2005. He has also played on the European Tour since 2005.

Amateur wins
1996 Western Australian Amateur
1997 Australian Amateur Medal (tied with Daniel Gaunt)

Professional wins (3)

Asian Tour wins (3)

Asian Tour playoff record (1–1)

Playoff record
PGA Tour of Australasia playoff record (0–1)

Results in major championships

Note: Pilkadaris never played in the Masters Tournament or the PGA Championship.

CUT = missed the half-way cut

External links

Australian male golfers
PGA Tour of Australasia golfers
Asian Tour golfers
European Tour golfers
Australian people of Greek descent
Golfers from Perth, Western Australia
Sportsmen from Western Australia
Golfers from Melbourne
1973 births
Living people